Jimmy Taylor (born 11 September 1984) is a professional rugby league footballer for the Leigh Centurions in the Co-Operative Championship.

Taylor played as a junior at Leigh East and toured New Zealand with the BARLA Young Lions side before joining hometown club Leigh Centurions, making his début in a home victory over London Broncos in 2005.

Taylor has twice won silverware with his only professional club, winning the Northern Rail Cup in 2006 against Hull Kingston Rovers, and the same competition again in 2011 against Halifax.

References
Leigh Centurions profile

1984 births
Living people
English rugby league players
Leigh Leopards players
Rugby league players from St Helens, Merseyside
Rugby league second-rows